Alfred Dolge Hose Co. No. 1 Building is a historic fire station located at Dolgeville in Herkimer County, New York.  It was built about 1890 and is a two-story, gable roofed, utilitarian frame structure above a cut stone basement.  It features a steeply pitched, standing seam metal roof and open belfry with a pyramidal roof.  It was originally built as a commercial structure, converted for use as a fire station in 1901, and used as such until 1991.

It was listed on the National Register of Historic Places in 1994.

References

Commercial buildings completed in 1890
Fire stations on the National Register of Historic Places in New York (state)
Buildings and structures in Herkimer County, New York
Defunct fire stations in New York (state)
National Register of Historic Places in Herkimer County, New York